A bus stop is a place, other than a terminal, established for buses to pick up and drop off passengers

Bus Stop may also refer to:

Culture
Bus Stop (William Inge play), a 1955 play by William Inge
The Bus Stop 《車站》, a 1983 Chinese-language play by Gao Xingjian

Film
Bus Stop (1956 film), a 1956 film, loosely based on the play, with Marilyn Monroe and Don Murray
Bus Stop (1982 film), the 1982 retelling of the original 1955 play starring Tim Matheson
Bus Stop (2012 film), a 2012 Telugu Indian film directed by Maruthi
Bus Stop (2017 film), a 2017 Marathi Indian film directed by Sameer Joshi

TV
Bus Stop (TV series), a 1961-62 television series
Bus Stop (2000 TV series), a 2000 Japanese series starring Naoko Iijima

Music
Bus Stop (band), a 1998 band known for a version of "Kung Fu Fighting"
Bus Stop (album), a 1966 album by The Hollies
Bus Stop, a popular line dance style of the 1970s.

Songs
"Bus Stop" (song), a 1966 single by The Hollies
"The Bus Stop Song", a 1956 single by The Four Lads, used as the intro song for the 1956 film Bus Stop
"(Are You Ready) Do The Bus Stop", a 1975 single by Fatback Band, also known as "Do the Bus Stop"